Call of the Wild is the sixth and penultimate album by The Amboy Dukes, credited as "Ted Nugent & The Amboy Dukes". Recorded in the summer of 1973, it is the first of two albums released on Frank Zappa's DiscReet Records, followed by Tooth Fang & Claw, the band's final album, in 1974. In 1977, both albums were reissued by Warner Bros as the compilation Two Originals of... Ted Nugent.

Music

The album's music featured elements of boogie, heavy metal and progressive rock.

Nugent's new, solid rhythm section included Rob Grange on bass and Vic Mastrianni on drums, adding a hard-driving rock beat to Nugent's music. The compositions, developed and gradually improved on stage since 1972 (with an Amboy Dukes' line-up changing frequently), were now sharpened and extended during months of intense touring, in the US and also in Canada. Nugent found new inspiration and energy in a more outdoor-oriented life (on his ranch in Michigan), hence an album title inspired by novelist Jack London. Most of the second side consisted of instrumental and self-speaking music. In addition to the rhythm section, Andy Jezowski (brother of Ted's then-wife Sandra Jezowski) performed most vocal parts on the record, and Gabriel Magno added keyboards and flute (on "Below the Belt").

Jezowski performed with the group as a part-time guest vocalist along the year. Gabe Magno occasionally gigged on stage with the Amboy Dukes, until he joined the band If by late 1973, and again later on with Nugent in April 1979.

A final Dukes single was released by the new record company, "Sweet Revenge" b/w "Ain't It the Truth".

Track listing
All songs written by Ted Nugent, except where indicated:

"Call of the Wild" – 4:51
"Sweet Revenge" – 4:06
"Pony Express" – 5:21
"Ain't It the Truth"  (Rob Grange, Ted Nugent) – 4:57
"Renegade" (Rob Grange) – 3:33
"Rot Gut"  (Rob Grange, Ted Nugent, Gabriel Magno, Vic Mastrianni) – 2:45
"Below the Belt" – 7:03
"Cannon Balls" – 5:43

Personnel
 Andy Jezowski - vocals
 Ted Nugent - guitars, vocals, percussion
 Gabriel Magno - keyboards, flute
 Rob Grange - bass, vocals
 Vic Mastrianni - drums, vocals
 John Childs, engineer
 Lew Futterman, producer
 Bill Inglot, digital remastering
 Ken Perry, digital remastering

References 

1973 albums
The Amboy Dukes albums
DiscReet Records albums
Enigma Records albums